Doer may refer to:

Gary Doer, a Canadian politician
DOER Marine, a marine technology company

See also
Dör, a village in Győr-Moson-Sopron county, Hungary
Doering